Nevogilde may refer to:

Nevogilde (Lousada), a parish of the municipality of Lousada, Portugal.
Nevogilde (Porto), a parish of the municipality of Porto, Portugal.
Nevogilde (Vila Verde), a parish of the municipality of Vila Verde, Portugal.